The Janos Trail was a trade route from the mountains of southern New Mexico to Janos, Chihuahua.  It was the main route for copper ore from Santa Rita del Cobre to the smelters in Chihuahua.

History
The route of the Janos Trail follows an old Native American trade route to Chihuahua.  The Janos Trail was established about 1803 by the Spanish after they discovered the copper in the Pinos Altos Mountains of the Black Range at Santa Rita.

Further reading
 Romero, Anthony (2007) Finding the Lost Santa Rita/Janos Trail, Silver City Museum, Silver City, New Mexico, 

Historic trails and roads in New Mexico
Historic trails and roads in Mexico
Copper mining
1803 establishments in New Spain
New Spain
Native American history of New Mexico